Cyperus niveoides is a species of sedge that is found in South America in Bolivia and Peru.

The species was first formally described by the botanist Charles Baron Clarke in 1908.

See also
 List of Cyperus species

References

pearcei
Taxa named by Charles Baron Clarke
Plants described in 1908
Flora of Peru
Flora of Bolivia